A language family is a group of languages related through descent from a common ancestral language or parental language, called the proto-language of that family. The term "family" reflects the tree model of language origination in historical linguistics, which makes use of a metaphor comparing languages to people in a biological family tree, or in a subsequent modification, to species in a phylogenetic tree of evolutionary taxonomy. Linguists therefore describe the daughter languages within a language family as being genetically related.

According to Ethnologue there are 7,151 living human languages distributed in 142 different language families. A living language is defined as one that is the first language of at least one person. The language families with the most speakers are: the Indo-European family, with many widely spoken languages native to Europe (such as English and Spanish) and South Asia (such as Hindi, Urdu and Bengali); and the Sino-Tibetan family, mainly due to the many speakers of Mandarin Chinese in China.

Lyle Campbell (2019) identifies a total of 406 independent language families, including language isolates.

There are also many dead languages which have no native speakers living, and extinct languages, which have no native speakers and no descendant languages. Finally, there are some languages that are insufficiently studied to be classified, and probably some which are not even known to exist outside their respective speech communities.

Membership of languages in a language family is established by research in comparative linguistics. Sister languages are said to descend "genetically" from a common ancestor. Speakers of a language family belong to a common speech community. The divergence of a proto-language into daughter languages typically occurs through geographical separation, with the original speech community gradually evolving into distinct linguistic units. Individuals belonging to other speech communities may also adopt languages from a different language family through the language shift process.

Genealogically related languages present shared retentions; that is, features of the proto-language (or reflexes of such features) that cannot be explained by chance or borrowing (convergence). Membership in a branch or group within a language family is established by shared innovations; that is, common features of those languages that are not found in the common ancestor of the entire family. For example, Germanic languages are "Germanic" in that they share vocabulary and grammatical features that are not believed to have been present in the Proto-Indo-European language. These features are believed to be innovations that took place in Proto-Germanic, a descendant of Proto-Indo-European that was the source of all Germanic languages.

Structure of a family 

Language families can be divided into smaller phylogenetic units, conventionally referred to as branches of the family because the history of a language family is often represented as a tree diagram. A family is a monophyletic unit; all its members derive from a common ancestor, and all attested descendants of that ancestor are included in the family. (Thus, the term family is analogous to the biological term clade.)

Some taxonomists restrict the term family to a certain level, but there is little consensus in how to do so. Those who affix such labels also subdivide branches into groups, and groups into complexes. A top-level (i.e., the largest) family is often called a phylum or stock. The closer the branches are to each other, the more closely the languages will be related. This means if a branch of a proto-language is four branches down and there is also a sister language to that fourth branch, then the two sister languages are more closely related to each other than to that common ancestral proto-language.

The term macrofamily or superfamily is sometimes applied to proposed groupings of language families whose status as phylogenetic units is generally considered to be unsubstantiated by accepted historical linguistic methods.

There is a remarkably similar pattern shown by the linguistic tree and the genetic tree of human ancestry 
that was verified statistically. Languages interpreted in terms of the putative phylogenetic tree of human languages are transmitted to a great extent vertically (by ancestry) as opposed to horizontally (by spatial diffusion).

Dialect continua 

Some close-knit language families, and many branches within larger families, take the form of dialect continua in which there are no clear-cut borders that make it possible to unequivocally identify, define, or count individual languages within the family. However, when the differences between the speech of different regions at the extremes of the continuum are so great that there is no mutual intelligibility between them, as occurs in Arabic, the continuum cannot meaningfully be seen as a single language.

A speech variety may also be considered either a language or a dialect depending on social or political considerations. Thus, different sources, especially over time, can give wildly different numbers of languages within a certain family. Classifications of the Japonic family, for example, range from one language (a language isolate with dialects) to nearly twenty—until the classification of Ryukyuan as separate languages within a Japonic language family rather than dialects of Japanese, the Japanese language itself was considered a language isolate and therefore the only language in its family.

Isolates 

Most of the world's languages are known to be related to others. Those that have no known relatives (or for which family relationships are only tentatively proposed) are called language isolates, essentially language families consisting of a single language. There are an estimated 129 language isolates known today. An example is Basque. In general, it is assumed that language isolates have relatives or had relatives at some point in their history but at a time depth too great for linguistic comparison to recover them.

It is commonly misunderstood that language isolates are classified as such because there is not sufficient data on or documentation of the language. This is false because a language isolate is classified based on the fact that enough is known about the isolate to compare it genetically to other languages but no common ancestry or relationship is found with any other known language.

A language isolated in its own branch within a family, such as Albanian and Armenian within Indo-European, is often also called an isolate, but the meaning of the word "isolate" in such cases is usually clarified with a modifier. For instance, Albanian and Armenian may be referred to as an "Indo-European isolate". By contrast, so far as is known, the Basque language is an absolute isolate: it has not been shown to be related to any other modern language despite numerous attempts. Another well-known isolate is Mapudungun, the Mapuche language from the Araucanían language family in Chile. A language may be said to be an isolate currently but not historically if related but now extinct relatives are attested. The Aquitanian language, spoken in Roman times, may have been an ancestor of Basque, but it could also have been a sister language to the ancestor of Basque. In the latter case, Basque and Aquitanian would form a small family together. (Ancestors are not considered to be distinct members of a family.)

Proto-languages 

A proto-language can be thought of as a mother language (not to be confused with a mother tongue, which is one that a specific person has been exposed to from birth), being the root which all languages in the family stem from. The common ancestor of a language family is seldom known directly since most languages have a relatively short recorded history. However, it is possible to recover many features of a proto-language by applying the comparative method, a reconstructive procedure worked out by 19th century linguist August Schleicher. This can demonstrate the validity of many of the proposed families in the list of language families. For example, the reconstructible common ancestor of the Indo-European language family is called Proto-Indo-European. Proto-Indo-European is not attested by written records and so is conjectured to have been spoken before the invention of writing.

Other classifications of languages

Sprachbund 

A sprachbund is a geographic area having several languages that feature common linguistic structures. The similarities between those languages are caused by language contact, not by chance or common origin, and are not recognized as criteria that define a language family. An example of a sprachbund would be the Indian subcontinent.

Shared innovations, acquired by borrowing or other means, are not considered genetic and have no bearing with the language family concept. It has been asserted, for example, that many of the more striking features shared by Italic languages (Latin, Oscan, Umbrian, etc.) might well be "areal features". However, very similar-looking alterations in the systems of long vowels in the West Germanic languages greatly postdate any possible notion of a proto-language innovation (and cannot readily be regarded as "areal", either, since English and continental West Germanic were not a linguistic area). In a similar vein, there are many similar unique innovations in Germanic, Baltic and Slavic that are far more likely to be areal features than traceable to a common proto-language. But legitimate uncertainty about whether shared innovations are areal features, coincidence, or inheritance from a common ancestor, leads to disagreement over the proper subdivisions of any large language family.

Contact languages 

The concept of language families is based on the historical observation that languages develop dialects, which over time may diverge into distinct languages. However, linguistic ancestry is less clear-cut than familiar biological ancestry, in which species do not crossbreed. It is more like the evolution of microbes, with extensive lateral gene transfer. Quite distantly related languages may affect each other through language contact, which in extreme cases may lead to languages with no single ancestor, whether they be creoles or mixed languages. In addition, a number of sign languages have developed in isolation and appear to have no relatives at all. Nonetheless, such cases are relatively rare and most well-attested languages can be unambiguously classified as belonging to one language family or another, even if this family's relation to other families is not known.

Language contact can lead to the development of new languages from the mixture of two or more languages for the purposes of interactions between two groups who speak different languages. Languages that arise in order for two groups to communicate with each other to engage in commercial trade or that appeared as a result of colonialism are called pidgin. Pidgins are an example of linguistic and cultural expansion caused by language contact. However, language contact can also lead to cultural divisions. In some cases, two different language speaking groups can feel territorial towards their language and do not want any changes to be made to it. This causes language boundaries and groups in contact are not willing to make any compromises to accommodate the other language.

See also 

 Constructed language
 Endangered language
 Extinct language
 Language death
 List of revived languages
 Global language system
 ISO 639-5
 Linguist List 
 List of language families
 List of languages by number of native speakers
 Origin of language
 Proto-language
 Proto-Human language
 Tree model
 Unclassified language
 Father Tongue hypothesis
 Farming/language dispersal hypothesis

References

Further reading 

 
 Boas, Franz. (1922). Handbook of American Indian languages (Vol. 2). Bureau of American Ethnology, Bulletin 40. Washington, D.C.: Government Print Office (Smithsonian Institution, Bureau of American Ethnology).
 Boas, Franz. (1933). Handbook of American Indian languages (Vol. 3). Native American legal materials collection, title 1227. Glückstadt: J.J. Augustin.
 Campbell, Lyle. (1997). American Indian languages: The historical linguistics of Native America. New York: Oxford University Press. .
 Campbell, Lyle; & Mithun, Marianne (Eds.). (1979). The languages of native America: Historical and comparative assessment. Austin: University of Texas Press.
 Goddard, Ives (Ed.). (1996). Languages. Handbook of North American Indians (W. C. Sturtevant, General Ed.) (Vol. 17). Washington, D.C.: Smithsonian Institution. .
 Goddard, Ives. (1999). Native languages and language families of North America (rev. and enlarged ed. with additions and corrections). [Map]. Lincoln, NE: University of Nebraska Press (Smithsonian Institution). (Updated version of the map in Goddard 1996). .
 Gordon, Raymond G., Jr. (Ed.). (2005). Ethnologue: Languages of the world (15th ed.). Dallas, TX: SIL International. . (Online version: Ethnologue: Languages of the World).
 Greenberg, Joseph H. (1966). The Languages of Africa (2nd ed.). Bloomington: Indiana University.
 Harrison, K. David. (2007) When Languages Die: The Extinction of the World's Languages and the Erosion of Human Knowledge. New York and London: Oxford University Press.
 Mithun, Marianne. (1999). The languages of Native North America. Cambridge: Cambridge University Press.  (hbk); .
 Ross, Malcolm. (2005). "Pronouns as a preliminary diagnostic for grouping Papuan languages ". In: Andrew Pawley, Robert Attenborough, Robin Hide and Jack Golson, eds, Papuan pasts: cultural, linguistic and biological histories of Papuan-speaking peoples (PDF)
 Ruhlen, Merritt. (1987). A guide to the world's languages. Stanford: Stanford University Press.
 Sturtevant, William C. (Ed.). (1978–present). Handbook of North American Indians (Vol. 1–20). Washington, D.C.: Smithsonian Institution. (Vols. 1–3, 16, 18–20 not yet published).
 Voegelin, C. F. & Voegelin, F. M. (1977). Classification and index of the world's languages. New York: Elsevier.

External links 
 Linguistic maps (from Muturzikin)
 Ethnologue
 The Multitree Project
 Lenguas del mundo (World Languages)
 Comparative Swadesh list tables of various language families (from Wiktionary)
 Most similar languages

Historical linguistics